Bassa Vah is a Unicode block containing characters historically used for writing the Bassa language of Liberia and Sierra Leone.

History
The following Unicode-related documents record the purpose and process of defining specific characters in the Bassa Vah block:

References 

Unicode blocks
Bassa language